Bukovany is a municipality and village in Příbram District in the Central Bohemian Region of the Czech Republic. It has about 90 inhabitants.

Administrative parts
The village of Sedlečko is an administrative part of Bukovany.

References

Villages in Příbram District